Benjamin Julius Caesar (12 March 1797 – 1867) was an English professional cricketer who played first-class cricket from 1824 to 1830.  He was mainly associated with Godalming Cricket Club and Surrey and made 11 known appearances in first-class matches.  He was the father of Julius Caesar.

References

1797 births
1867 deaths
English cricketers
English cricketers of 1787 to 1825
English cricketers of 1826 to 1863
Surrey cricketers
Godalming Cricket Club cricketers